Miguel Ângelo may refer to:

 Miguel Ângelo (singer), lead vocalist of Delfins
 Miguel Ângelo (futsal player) (born 1994), Portuguese futsal player
 Miguel Ângelo (footballer, born 1984), Portuguese footballer
 Miguel Ângelo (footballer, born 1995), Portuguese footballer
 Miguel Ângelo (footballer, born 1970), Portuguese footballer and coach
 Miguel Ângelo Faria (born 1995), Portuguese footballer